The 22609 / 10 Mangalore Central - Coimbatore Intercity Superfast Express is a Express express train belonging to Indian Railways Southern Railway zone that runs between  and  in India. This service assumed operation on 18th Nov 2011 initially from Palakkad Junction & got extended to Coimbatore in the year 2012.

Coaches
The 22609 / 10 Mangalore Central - Coimbatore Junction Intercity Express has 
 2 AC Chair Car,  
 12 Second Sitting, 
 6 General Unreserved, 
 2 SLR (seating with luggage rake) coaches.

It does not carry a pantry car coach.

As is customary with most train services in India, coach composition may be amended at the discretion of Indian Railways depending on demand.

Service

As the average speed of the train is above , as per railway rules, its fare includes a Superfast surcharge.

Routing

Traction
As the route is electrified, an Erode based  WAP-4 or Royapuram based WAP-7 electric locomotive pulls the train to its destination.

References

External links
22609 Intercity Express at India Rail Info
22610 Intercity Express at India Rail Info

Intercity Express (Indian Railways) trains
Transport in Mangalore
Rail transport in Karnataka
Rail transport in Kerala
Rail transport in Tamil Nadu
Transport in Coimbatore